The Church of Our Lady of Rosary is a Roman Catholic church in Vrlika, Croatia. It is located in the center of town.

Description 

The church has marble altar with picture of Lady with Jesus in arms. The picture was probably procured in the 18th century in Venice by Filip Grabovac. 

It has few statues: statue of Saints Peter and Paul, statue of Saint Anthony, statue of Saint Anne and statue of Sacred Heart.

History 

The church was built from 1876 till 1898, when it was dedicated. 

During the Croatian War of Independence, statues of Saints Peter and Paul were damaged, because Serbs obtruncate heads.

References 

Roman Catholic churches in Croatia
Buildings and structures in Split-Dalmatia County